Alexander Eremenko, also transliterated Yeryomenko, may refer to:
 Alexandre Eremenko (born 1954), Ukrainian-American mathematician
 Alexander Yeryomenko (born 1980), Russian ice hockey player